Yesss is a common elongation of the word Yes and may refer to:
Yesss, a subsidiary of the mobile network provider A1 Telekom Austria
The YeSSS Unified Satellite Communication System; see Gorizont
Yesss, a character in the animated film Ralph Breaks the Internet

See also
Yes (disambiguation)